Engelberg is a German-language surname.

Geographical distribution
As of 2014, 29.3% of all known bearers of the surname Engelberg were residents of Germany (frequency 1:111,120), 25.1% of the United States (1:583,605), 12.6% of Brazil (1:659,717), 10.0% of Israel (1:34,957), 4.5% of Canada (1:331,514), 3.5% of Norway (1:60,498), 2.4% of Sweden (1:169,772), 2.1% of Finland (1:105,708), 1.5% of Poland (1:1,000,231), 1.5% of Denmark (1:152,555), 1.5% of Belgium (1:319,372), 1.3% of South Africa (1:1,686,704) and 1.3% of Argentina (1:1,378,823).

In Germany, the frequency of the surname was higher than national average (1:111,120) in the following states:
 1. Mecklenburg-Vorpommern (1:23,299)
 2. Bremen (1:36,604)
 3. Hamburg (1:50,431)
 4. North Rhine-Westphalia (1:58,880)
 5. Saxony-Anhalt (1:64,611)
 6. Lower Saxony (1:88,861)
 7. Schleswig-Holstein (1:93,474)

People
 Evaristo Conrado Engelberg (1853–1932), Brazilian mechanical engineer and inventor
 Miriam Engelberg (1958–2006), graphic novelist and illustrator
 Amy and Wendy Engelberg, American television writing and producing team

See also 
 Engelberger
 Engelsberg (disambiguation)

References

German-language surnames

de:Engelberg